Robinsonekspedisjonen 2016 is the fifteenth season of the Norwegian reality television series Robinsonekspedisjonen. This season, 16 contestants from across Norway compete in challenges until one remains to be crowned this year's Robinson winner and the grand prize of NOK 300,000. This was the second and final season to air on TV2 as after the season's finale, the show was cancelled by the network due to dwindling viewers. The season premiered on 6 March 2016 and concluded on 29 May 2016 where Thomas Larsen won against Marte Ytre-Hauge in a 4-3  jury vote.

Finishing order

References

External links

2016
2016 Norwegian television seasons